The 1947–48 Serie A season was won by Torino.

Teams 
Pro Patria for Northern Italy, Lucchese for Central Italy and Salernitana for Southern Italy had been promoted from Serie B.

Events
Triestina participated as guest, but the final table excluded Napoli instead, which was disqualified for bribery.

Final classification

Results

Top goalscorers

References and sources
Almanacco Illustrato del Calcio - La Storia 1898-2004, Panini Edizioni, Modena, September 2005

External links
  - All results on RSSSF Website.

Serie A seasons
Italy
1947–48 in Italian football leagues